Rhoderick McGown (born 10 October 1972) is a Zimbabwean freestyle and butterfly swimmer. He competed in three events at the 1992 Summer Olympics.

References

External links
 

1972 births
Living people
Zimbabwean male butterfly swimmers
Zimbabwean male freestyle swimmers
Olympic swimmers of Zimbabwe
Swimmers at the 1992 Summer Olympics
Place of birth missing (living people)